Dawn Doyle is an Irish Sinn Féin activist.

Born in Wexford, Doyle worked in Sinn Féin's Press Office in Dublin for four years before becoming Sinn Féin's Director of Publicity, in 1998.  She served in this post for almost ten years, before becoming 26 County Director of Political Operations in 2008.  She served as General Secretary of the party from 2009 until 2020.

References

Year of birth missing (living people)
Living people
Irish republicans
Politicians from County Wexford
Sinn Féin politicians
21st-century Irish women politicians